This article contains the list of casualties of Husayn ibn Ali's relatives and companions in the Battle of Karbala. The battle took place on Friday Muharram 10, in the year 61 AH of the Islamic calendar (October 10, 680 CE) in Karbala, situated in present-day Iraq.

The battle was between Yazid's army from Syria reinforced by troops from Kufa, and the caravan of families and companions of Husayn ibn Ali, the grandson of the Islamic prophet, Muhammad. It is claimed that 72 males (including Husayn's 6 months old son) of Husayn's companions were killed by the forces of Yazid I.

Army of Husayn ibn Ali
The following is a list of casualties of Husayn ibn Ali's companions in Battle of Karbala.

Members of Banu Hashim 
These people were descendants of Abu Talib ibn Abd al-Muttalib and members of Banu Hashim who died in the Battle of Karbala.

Descendants of Ali ibn Abi Talib

Sons of Ali ibn Abi Talib 
The following were sons of Ali:
 Husayn ibn Ali, son of Fatima.
 Ja'far ibn Ali, half-brother of Husayn ibn Ali, son of Umm al-Banin.
 Abd Allah ibn Ali, half-brother of Husayn ibn Ali, son of Umm al-Banin.
 Uthman ibn Ali, half-brother of Husayn ibn Ali, son of Umm al-Banin.
 Abbas ibn Ali, half-brother of Husayn ibn Ali, son of Umm al-Banin, the flag-bearer of Husayn's army.
 Abu Bakr ibn Ali, half-brother of Husayn ibn Ali, son of Layla bint Mas'ud.
 Muhammad al-Asghar ibn Ali, half-brother of Husayn ibn Ali, son of Layla bint Mas'ud.
 Umar ibn Ali, half-brother of Husayn ibn Ali, son of Al-Sahba bint Rabi'a.

Sons of Hasan ibn Ali 
The following were sons of Hasan ibn Ali (an elder brother of Husayn ibn Ali):
 Al-Qasim ibn Hasan
 Abu Bakr ibn Hasan
 Abd Allah ibn Hasan
 Bishr ibn Hasan

Sons of Husayn ibn Ali 
The following were sons of Husayn ibn Ali:
 Ali al-Akbar ibn Husayn, a son of Husayn ibn Ali and Layla bint Abi Murrah al-Thaqafi.
 Ali al-Asghar ibn Husayn, the six-month-old son of Husayn ibn Ali and Rubab bint Imra al-Qais.

Sons of Abbas ibn Ali 
The following were sons of Abbas ibn Ali (a brother of Husayn ibn Ali):
 Qasim ibn Abbas
 Fadl ibn Abbas

Descendants of Ja'far ibn Abi Talib 
The following were descendants of Ja'far ibn Abi Talib (a brother of Ali) and the sons of Abd Allah ibn Ja'far:
 Awn ibn Abd Allah ibn Ja'far, son of Zaynab bint Ali.
 Muhammad ibn Abd Allah ibn Ja'far, son of Zaynab bint Ali.
 Muhammad ibn Abd Allah ibn Ja'far, a younger son of Abd Allah ibn Ja'far; his mother was Khausa, daughter of Hafsa ibn Rabi'a.

Descendants of Aqil ibn Abi Talib 
The following were descendants of Aqil ibn Abi Talib (a brother of Husayn's father Ali):
 Ja'far ibn Aqil
 Abd al-Rahman ibn Aqil
 Abd Allah ibn Aqil
 Muhammad ibn Abi Sa'id ibn Aqil

Companions of Muhammad 
The following are the companions (Sahaba) of Muhammad who died at the Battle of Karbala:
 Anas ibn al-Harith al-Kahili
 Abu Hajal Muslim ibn Awsaja

Other companions of Husayn ibn Ali (non-Banu Hashim) 
These are the companions of Husayn ibn Ali who died in the Battle of Karbala.

See also

 Family tree of Ali
 Ashura
 Tasu'a
 Sermon of Zaynab bint Ali in the court of Yazid
 Sermon of Ali ibn Husayn in Damascus
 Arba'een Pilgrimage
 Ziyarat Ashura

References

Lists of martyrs